Young William was launched at Whitby in 1779. Initially, she was a West Indiaman. Later she traded more widely, particularly to Russia and the Baltic. She was captured and recaptured in 1814 and was lost on Nargon Island in 1815.

Career
Young William appeared in Lloyd's Register (LR) in 1781 with G. Hastings, master, Atty & Cop., owners, and trade London–Jamaica.

On 9 September 1814 the American privateer  captured Young William, of Hull, Stevenson, master, as Young William was sailing from London to Halifax, Nova Scotia.  recaptured Young William and took her into St John's, Newfoundland. 

The Register of Shipping for 1816 showed Young William with Stephenson, master, Hall & Co., owners, and trade London–Hamburg. She had undergone a thorough repair in 1811 and repairs for damages in 1813.

Fate
Young William, Stephenson, master, was wrecked on 7 November 1815 on Nargoon Island while on a voyage from Saint Petersburg to London. Her crew were rescued.

Citations and references
Citations

References
 
  

1779 ships
Age of Sail merchant ships of England
Captured ships
Maritime incidents in 1815